The 1994–95 Kategoria e Dytë was the 48th season of a second-tier association football league in Albania.

Group A

Group B

Championship final

Promotion/relegation playoff

References

 Giovanni Armillotta

Kategoria e Parë seasons
2
Alba